The , commonly known as  is an automated guideway transit system in Kobe, Japan. Upon its opening on February 21, 1990, it became the second AGT line operated by Kobe New Transit. The line connects the man-made Rokkō Island to Sumiyoshi Station on the JR Kobe Line.

Stations

Rolling stock 

Kobe New Transit 3000 series (since 2018)
Kobe New Transit 1000 series (from 1990 until 2023)

See also 
Port Island Line

External links

 Kobe New Transit

People mover systems in Japan
Rail transport in Hyōgo Prefecture
Transport in Kobe
Railway lines opened in 1990
1990 establishments in Japan